(Ah, how fleeting, ah how insignificant), 26, is a church cantata by Johann Sebastian Bach. He composed the chorale cantata in Leipzig for the 24th Sunday after Trinity and first performed it on 19 November 1724.

The cantata is based upon the hymn "", versed and composed by Michael Franck in 1652. The tune was later edited by Johann Crüger. It is the only time Bach used this hymn, except BWV 644 (Orgelbüchlein). Its theme, the transience of human life, is the only connection to the prescribed gospel reading. The first and last stanza are used unchanged in both text and tune: the former is treated as a chorale fantasia, the latter as a four-part closing chorale. An unknown librettist paraphrased the inner stanzas as arias and recitatives. Bach scored the cantata for four vocal soloists, a four-part choir, and a Baroque instrumental ensemble of horn, flute, three oboes, strings and continuo.

History and words 
Bach wrote the cantata in 1724 in his second year in Leipzig for the 24th Sunday after Trinity. That year, Bach composed a chorale cantata cycle, begun on the first Sunday after Trinity. The prescribed readings for the Sunday were from the Epistle to the Colossians, a prayer for the Colossians, and from the Gospel of Matthew, the story of the Raising of Jairus' daughter. The cantata is based on "Ach wie flüchtig, ach wie nichtig", a hymn in 13 stanzas by Michael Franck (1652), to a melody by Johann Crüger (1661), "a meditation on the transience of human life and of all earthly goods". This aspect is the only connection to the gospel. An unknown poet retained the first and the last stanza unchanged the outer movements 1 and 6 of the cantata. He derived the four inner movements as a sequence of alternating arias and recitatives from the inner stanzas. John Eliot Gardiner points out that "several of Bach's late Trinity season cantatas" concentrate on "the brevity of human life and the futility of earthly hopes".

Bach first performed the cantata on 19 November 1724. It is the only time that he used this hymn.

Music

Scoring and structure 

Bach structured the cantata in six movements. The text and tune of the hymn appear unchanged in the outer choral movements, a chorale fantasia and a four-part closing chorale, which frame a sequence of alternating arias and recitatives. Bach scored the work for four vocal soloists (soprano, alto, tenor, bass), a four-part choir and a Baroque instrumental ensemble of a horn (Co) doubling the soprano in the chorale, flauto traverso (Ft), three oboes (Ob), two violins (Vl), viola (Va), organ (Org) and basso continuo. 

In the following table of the movements, the scoring follows the Neue Bach-Ausgabe. The keys and time signatures are taken from Alfred Dürr, using the symbol for common time (4/4).

Music 

The opening chorus, "" (Ah, how fleeting, ah how insignificant), is a chorale fantasia. The instruments play concertante music, to which the soprano sings the cantus firmus line by line. The lower voices act as a "self-contained group", mostly in homophony, and "declaim the individual lines of text in unison at the end of each choral passage, using a melodic formula derived from the beginning of the hymn." Bach illustrates the imagery of the text, "fleetingness and insubstantiality" in motifs such as "abrupt chords separated by pauses and ... hurrying scale figures". Gardiner comments:  The musicologist Julian Mincham compares the instrumental music to "mist and fog, images which imply movements of wind and air" and hears the lower voices as "evincing a feeling of primeval power and solidarity".

In the first aria, the text "" (As quickly as rushing water) is illustrated in the flute, the violin and the tenor voice by "fast-flowing" music, "each musician required to keep changing functions – to respond, imitate, echo or double one another – while variously contributing to the insistent onwardness of the tumbling torrent".

In a recitative for alto, "" (Joy becomes sadness), images such as flowers speak of transience until the grave. The Bach scholar Klaus Hofmann describes it as a "far-reaching coloratura [which] culminates in an uneasy dissonance".

In the last aria, an "unusual oboe trio" accompanies the bass voice in "" (To hang one's heart on earthly treasures). Gardiner comments: "He scores this Totentanz (Dance of the dead) for three oboes and continuo supporting his bass soloist in a mock bourrée", the oboes undermining in "throbbing accompaniment ... those earthly pleasures by which men are seduced", then representing "through jagged figures ... the tongues of flame which will soon reduce them to ashes, and finally in hurtling semiquaver scales of 6/4 chords ... surging waves which will tear all worldly things apart". Mincham sees a connection of the runs to those of movement 1, but points out how different their function is here: 

A recitative for soprano, "" (The highest glory and magnificence), expresses that even highest power will not escape death.

The closing chorale, "" (Ah, how fleeting, ah how insignificant), is a four-part setting.

Recordings 
The listing is taken from the selection on the Bach Cantatas Website. Instrumental groups playing period instruments in historically informed performances are highlighted green under the header .

References

Sources 
 
 Ach wie flüchtig, ach wie nichtig BWV 26; BC A 162 / Chorale cantata (24th Sunday after Trinity) Leipzig University
 BWV 26 Ach wie flüchtig, ach wie nichtig English translation, University of Vermont
 Luke Dahn: BWV 26.6 bach-chorales.com

Church cantatas by Johann Sebastian Bach
1724 compositions